() is the immediate prelude to the events of Ragnarök in Norse mythology.

Etymology
 comes from Old Norse, meaning 'awful, mighty winter'. The prefix fimbul means 'mighty' so the literal interpretation is 'mighty winter'.

Summary
 is the harsh winter that precedes the end of the world and puts an end to all life on Earth.  is three successive winters, when snow comes in from all directions, without any intervening summer. Innumerable wars follow.

The event is described primarily in the Poetic Edda. Vafþrúðnir responds that Líf and Lífþrasir will survive and that they will live in the forest of Hoddmímis holt.

The mythology might be related to the volcanic winter of 536, which resulted in a notable drop in temperature across northern Europe. There have also been several popular ideas about whether the particular piece of mythology has a connection to the climate change that occurred in the Nordic countries at the end of the Nordic Bronze Age from about 650 BC.

In Denmark, Norway, Sweden, and other Nordic countries, the term  has been borrowed from Old Norse to refer to an unusually cold and harsh winter. However in Sweden, another common word is '', which means 'wolf winter'.

See also
Eschatology
Laki 1783 eruption
Nuclear winter
Ragnarök
Volcanic winter

References

Bibliography
Gunn, Joel (2000). The Years Without Summer: Tracing A.D. 536 and its Aftermath (British Archaeological Reports International. Oxford, England: Archaeopress) 
Keys, David Patrick (2000). Catastrophe: An Investigation into the Origins of the Modern World. (New York: Ballantine Pub) .
Larrington, Carolyne (Trans.) (1999). The Poetic Edda (Oxford World's Classics) 
Lindow, John (2001). Norse Mythology: A Guide to the Gods, Heroes, Rituals, and Beliefs (Oxford University Press) 
Orchard, Andy (1997). Dictionary of Norse Myth and Legend (Cassell) 

Eschatology in Norse mythology
Events in Norse mythology
Winter weather events